The Serie B 1938–39 was the tenth tournament of this competition played in Italy since its creation.

Teams
Casale, Fanfulla, SPAL, Siena and Salernitana had been promoted from Serie C, while Novara and Alessandria had been relegated from Serie A.

Events
The league was expanded to eighteen clubs to allow a wider representation of Southern Italy. 

The goal average substituted the tie-breaker in event of equal points, to save time considering the risk of war. This change greatly helped Venezia.

Final classification

Results

References and sources
Almanacco Illustrato del Calcio - La Storia 1898-2004, Panini Edizioni, Modena, September 2005

1938-1939
2
Italy